Emma Marcegaglia (born 24 December 1965 in Mantua) is an Italian entrepreneur. She was president of Confindustria from 2008 to 2012, and president of the Libera Università Internazionale degli Studi Sociali Guido Carli from 2010 to 2019. From 2014 to 2020 she was president of Eni.

Life 
She graduated from the Bocconi University in 1989, and studied at New York University.

From 2004 to 2008 she was a vice president of Confindustria. She was Italian representative for energy, competitiveness and environment of the European Commission. From 2008 to 2012 she was president of Confindustria. From 2013 to 2018 she was president of Confederation of European Business. She was a member of the  board of Banco Popolare. She was also chairman of the Aretè Onlus Foundation.

Family 
She is the second daughter of Palmira Bazzani and Steno Marcegaglia, founder of the company Marcegaglia, a steel tube company.

In 2001, she married Roberto Vancini, and in 2003 she had a daughter, Gaia.

References

External links 
 Executive Chat with Emma Marcegaglia, president and CEO Marcegaglia Group – YouTube

1965 births
Living people
People from Mantua
Bocconi University alumni
21st-century Italian businesswomen
21st-century Italian businesspeople